Gattico is a frazione of the  comune (municipality) of Gattico-Veruno in the Province of Novara in the Italian region Piedmont, located about  northeast of Turin and about  north of Novara. It was a separate commune until 2018.

It is home to a Romanesque pieve (baptismal church) dating to the Middle Age, the San Martino Church: the ruins are now well preserved in a wood. The pieve had some other medieval chapels, now in ruins but still interesting: Sant'Andrea chapel has three different concurrent building phases in the well-preserved apse. 

Cities and towns in Piedmont